The Asianet Film Awards is an award ceremony for  films presented annually by Asianet, a Malayalam-language television network from the south-Indian state of Kerala. Asianet says that awards ceremony has been instituted to honour both artistic and technical excellence in the Malayalam language film industry.

The awards ceremony was co-sponsored by Johnson & Johnson in the year 1998 later Lux took up the sponsorship in the next 5 years. Then Jiva soap in 2004 and then Ujala for many years. From 2016, function is sponsored by Nirapara. Bhima Jewellers took the title sponsor in 2018 event. The function is normally held in Kochi , Angamaly and Thiruvananthapuram cities in Kerala. It was also held twice in Dubai.

The most recent award was the 21st Asianet Film Awards which held on 6 and 7 April 2019 at Kochi.

Awards Categories

Awards for Film

Best Film 
The Asianet Film Award for Best Film has been awarded since 1998.

Most Popular Film 
The Asianet Film Award for Most Popular Film has been awarded since 2012.

Awards for Actors/Actresses

Best Actor 
The Asianet Film Award for Best Actor has been awarded since 1998.

Best Actress 
The Asianet Film Award for Best Actress has been awarded since 1998.Manju warrier won 5 awards.

 : Meera Jasmine is the only actress till time who has won the award three times constantly in a row.

Most Popular Actor 
The Asianet Film Award for Most Popular Actor has been awarded since 2007. Priviraj Sukumaran mostly won the award (3times).

Most Popular Actress 
The Asianet Film Award for Most Popular Actress has been awarded since 2009.

Best Supporting Actor 
The Asianet Film Award for Best Supporting Actor has been awarded since 1998.

Best Supporting Actress 
The Asianet Film Award for Best Supporting Actress has been awarded since 1998.

Best Character Actor 
The Asianet Film Award for Best Character Actor has been awarded since 2010.

Best Character Actress 
The Asianet Film Award for Best Character Actress has been awarded since 2010.

Best Actor in a Negative Role 
The Asianet Film Award for Best Villain Role has been awarded since 2006.

Best Actor in a Humorous Role 
The Asianet Film Award for Best Comic Role has been awarded since 2006.

Best New Face of the Year (Male) 
The Asianet Film Award for Best New Face of the Year - Male has been awarded since 2005.

Best New Face of the Year (Female) 
The Asianet Film Award for Best New Face of the Year - Female has been awarded since 2001.

Best Star Pair 
The Asianet Film Award for Best Star Pair has been awarded since 2001.

Youth Icon of the Year 
The Asianet Film Award for Best Youth Icon of the year has been awarded since 2009. Nivin Pauly and Kunchacko Boban holds the record of most reigns with two.

Best Child Artist (Male/Female) 
The Asianet Film Award for Best Child Artist (Male/Female) has been awarded since 2001. Baby Nivedita, Baby Anikha and Kalidas Jayaram holds the record of most reigns with two.

Technical Awards

Best Director 
The Asianet Film Award for Best Director  has been awarded since 1998.

Best Script Writer 
The Asianet Film Award for Best Script Writer has been awarded since 1998.

Best Cinematographer 
The Asianet Film Award for Best Cinematographer has been awarded since 1998.

{| class="wikitable" style="width:100%"
|- bgcolor="#bebebe"
! width="10%" style="background:#FAEB86" | Year
! width="45%" style="background:#FAEB86" | Winner
! width="45%" style="background:#FAEB86" | Film(s)
|-
| 1998
| colspan=2 
|-
| 1999
| Vipin Mohan
| Veendum Chila Veettukaryangal
|-
| 2000
| colspan=2 
|-
| 2001
| Venugopal
| Meghamalhar
|-
| 2002
| Venugopal
| Nammal
|-
| 2003
| S. Kumar
| Pattalam
|-
| 2004
| colspan=2 
|- bgcolor="#cfecec"
| 2005
| S. Kumar
| Udayananu Tharam
|-
| 2006
| Santosh Thundiyil
| Palunku
|-
| 2007
| Manoj Pillai
| Rock & Roll, Arabikatha
|- bgcolor="#cfecec"
| 2008]
| Santosh Thundiyil
| Aakasha Gopuram
|-
| 2009
| Ajayan Vincent
| Bhramaram
|-
| 2010
| Venu
| Kadha Thudarunnu, Pranchiyettan and the Saint
|-
| 2011
| Madhu Ambat
| Adaminte Makan Abu
|-
| 2012
| Jomon T. John
| Thattathin Marayathu
|-
| 2014
| Amal Neerad
| ''Iyobinte Pusthakam|- bgcolor="#cfecec"
| 2015
| Jomon T. John
| Ennu Ninte Moideen, Charlie
|-
| 2016
| Shaji Kumar
| Pulimurugan
|}

 Best Editing 
The Asianet Film Award for Best Editing has been awarded since 1998.

 Awards for Music 

 Best Music Director 
The Asianet Film Award for Best Music Director has been awarded since 1998.

 Best Lyricist 
The Asianet Film Award for Best Lyricist has been awarded since 1998.

 Best Playback Singer (Male) 
The Asianet Film Award for Best Male Playback Singer has been awarded since 1998.

 Best Playback Singer (Female) 
The Asianet Film Award for Best Female Playback Singer has been awarded since 1998.

 Special Award(s) 

 Lifetime Achievement Award 
The Asianet Film Award for Lifetime Achievement has been awarded since 1998.

 Honour Special Jury Award 
The Asianet Film Honour Special Jury Award has been awarded since 2005.

 Critics Award 
A special award has been given by Asianet since 2009.

 Other special awards 
A special award has been given by Asianet since 2009.

 Popular actor / actress Tamil 

 Former Awards 

 Most Popular Duet 
The Asianet Film Award for Most Popular Duet was only awarded in the year 2016.

 Most Popular Singer 
The Asianet Film Award for Most Popular Singer was awarded in the year 2012 only.

 Best Feature Film on National Integration 
The Asianet Film Award for Best Feature Film on National Integration was awarded in the years 2006 and 2010.

 Best Sound Recordist 
The Asianet Film Award for Best Sound Recordist was awarded in the years 2001, 2002, 2005 and 2006.

 Best Makeup Artist 
The Asianet Film Award for Best Makeup Artist''' was awarded in the years 2001 to 2003.

See also
 12th Asianet Film Awards
 13th Asianet Film Awards
 14th Asianet Film Awards
 15th Asianet Film Awards
 16th Asianet Film Awards
 17th Asianet Film Awards
 21st Asianet Film Awards

References

 List of 2009 Asianet Film Awards from Hindunet
 List of 2012 Asianet Film Awards from Entertainment OneIndia

External links
 Asianet Official website
 Asianet Film Awards Official website
  Asianet Film Awards at Internet Movie Database

 
Indian film awards
Malayalam cinema
Lifetime achievement awards
1998 establishments in Kerala
Awards established in 1998
Kerala awards